The Women's Open International de Squash de Nantes 2016 is the women's edition of the 2016 Open International de Squash de Nantes, which is a tournament of the PSA World Tour event Challenger (prize money: $5,000). The event took place at La Maison du Squash in Sautron and at La Cité International des Congrès in Nantes in France from 8 to 11 of September. Hana Ramadan won her first Open International de Nantes trophy, beating Rachael Chadwick in the final.

Prize money and ranking points
For 2016, the prize purse was $5,000. The prize money and points breakdown is as follows:

Seeds

Draw and results

See also
Men's Open International de Squash de Nantes 2016
Open International de Squash de Nantes
2016 PSA World Tour

References

External links
PSA Open International de Squash de Nantes 2016 website
Open International de Squash de Nantes official website

2016 in French sport
2016 in women's squash
Open international de squash de Nantes